Synodus is a genus of fish in the family Synodontidae found in Atlantic, Indian, and Pacific Oceans.

Species
Currently, 46 species in this genus are recognized:
 Synodus binotatus L. P. Schultz, 1953 (two-spot lizardfish)
 Synodus bondi Fowler, 1939 (sharp-nose lizardfish) 
 Synodus capricornis Cressey & J. E. Randall, 1978 (capricorn lizardfish)
 Synodus dermatogenys Fowler, 1912 
 Synodus doaki  Barry C. Russell & Cressey, 1979 (arrow-tooth lizardfish)
 Synodus evermanni D. S. Jordan & Bollman, 1890 (Inotted lizardfish)
 Synodus falcatus Waples & J. E. Randall, 1989
 Synodus fasciapelvicus J. E. Randall, 2009
 Synodus foetens (Linnaeus, 1766) (inshore lizardfish)
 Synodus fuscus S. Tanaka (I), 1917
 Synodus gibbsi Cressey, 1981
 Synodus hoshinonis S. Tanaka (I), 1917 (blackear lizardfish)
 Synodus indicus (F. Day, 1873) (Indian lizardfish)
 Synodus intermedius (Agassiz, 1829) (sand lizardfish)
 Synodus isolatus J. E. Randall, 2009 (Rapanui lizardfish)
 Synodus jaculum B. C. Russell & Cressey, 1979 (lighthouse lizardfish)
 Synodus kaianus (Günther, 1880) (Günther's lizardfish)
 Synodus lacertinus C. H. Gilbert, 1890 (sauro lizardfish)
 Synodus lobeli Waples & J. E. Randall, 1989 (Lobel's lizardfish)
 Synodus lucioceps (Ayres, 1855) (California lizardfish)
 Synodus macrocephalus Cressey, 1981
 Synodus macrops S. Tanaka (I), 1917 (triple-cross lizardfish)
 Synodus macrostigmus Frable, Luther & C. C. Baldwin, 2013 (large-spot lizardfish) 
 Synodus marchenae Hildebrand, 1946 (lizardfish)
 Synodus mascarensis Prokofiev, 2008
 Synodus mundyi J. E. Randall, 2009
 Synodus oculeus Cressey, 1981 (large-eye lizardfish)
 Synodus orientalis J. E. Randall & Pyle, 2008
 Synodus pacificus H. C. Ho, J. P. Chen & K. T. Shao, 2016 
 Synodus poeyi D. S. Jordan, 1887 (offshore lizardfish)
 Synodus pylei J. E. Randall, 2009
 Synodus randalli Cressey, 1981
 Synodus rubromarmoratus B. C. Russell & Cressey, 1979 (red-marbled lizardfish)
 Synodus sageneus Waite, 1905 (spear-toothed lizardfish)
 Synodus sanguineus J. E. Randall, 2009
 Synodus saurus (Linnaeus, 1758) (Atlantic lizardfish)
 Synodus scituliceps D. S. Jordan & C. H. Gilbert, 1882 (short-head lizardfish)
 Synodus sechurae Hildebrand, 1946 (Sechura lizardfish)
 Synodus similis McCulloch, 1921 (lavender lizardfish)
 Synodus synodus (Linnaeus, 1758) (diamond lizardfish)
 Synodus taiwanensis J. P. Chen, H. C. Ho & K. T. Shao, 2007
 Synodus tectus Cressey, 1981 (tectus lizardfish)
 Synodus ulae L. P. Schultz, 1953 (red lizardfish)
 Synodus usitatus Cressey, 1981
 Synodus variegatus (Lacépède, 1803) (variegated lizardfish)
 Synodus vityazi H. C. Ho, Prokofiev & K. T. Shao, 2010

References

 
Extant Miocene first appearances
Taxa named by Giovanni Antonio Scopoli
Marine fish genera